Matador is a 1986 Spanish erotic thriller film co-written and directed by Pedro Almodóvar about a student matador, Ángel Giménez (Antonio Banderas), who confesses to murders he did not commit.

Plot
Diego Montes (Nacho Martínez) is a former bullfighter who was forced into early retirement after being gored. He finds sexual gratification by viewing slasher films. Among the students in his bullfighting class is Ángel, a diffident young man who suffers from vertigo. During one episode of vertigo in the practice ring, Ángel has a vision of a woman killing a man with a hairpin during sex, in a manner similar to how a matador kills a bull. After class, Diego asks Ángel if he is homosexual, noting that he is not experienced with women. Ángel says he is not and vows to prove himself. Later that day, Ángel rapes his neighbour Eva (Eva Cobo), who is also Diego's girlfriend. As she leaves him, she trips in the mud and gashes her cheek. At the sight of her blood, Ángel faints.

The next day, Ángel's mother insists that he go to church as a condition of living in her home. After mass, she insists that he go to confession. He instead goes to the police station to confess to the rape. When Eva is brought to the station, she says he ejaculated before penetrating her and declines to press charges. Alone with the police detective (Eusebio Poncela), Ángel notices photos of dead men with the same wound administered by the woman seen during his earlier spell of vertigo. He confesses to having killed them. The detective then asks about two missing women, who were also students of Diego, and Ángel confesses to killing them as well.
 
Although Ángel is able to lead the police to the two women's bodies buried outside Diego's home, the detective is not convinced. He questions how Ángel could have buried them there without Diego's knowledge, finds that Ángel has an alibi for the murder of one of the men, and discovers that he faints at the sight of blood. Meanwhile, Ángel's lawyer, María Cardenal (Assumpta Serna)  the woman from Ángel's dream  suspects that Diego killed the two women. She takes him to a remote house where she has collected memorabilia related to Diego since she first saw him kill a bull. At Diego's home, Eva overhears the two and realizes that they are the killers. When María leaves, Eva tells Diego he has to take her back since she knows everything. Eva then goes to María to tell her to stay away from Diego, since Eva knows her secrets. María's reaction does not reassure Eva, and she goes to the police.
 
While Eva is telling the detective what she has heard, Ángel's psychiatrist (Carmen Maura) calls the detective to tell him that Ángel has seen Diego and María in a vertigo trance, and that they are in danger. Ángel is able to guide them to María's house. Just as the police, Ángel, Eva, and the psychiatrist arrive, an eclipse begins and they hear a gunshot. María has stabbed Diego between the shoulder blades and shot herself in the mouth as they were making love. Viewing the scene, the detective says that it is better this way and that he has never seen anyone happier.

Production
Pedro Almodóvar said the opening sex scene between Assumpta Serna and Jesús Ruyman was unsimulated.

When he was filming the final scene with Assumpta Serna, Pedro Almodóvar was not sure whether Nacho Martínez, playing the wounded matador who was about to make love to her, should graze her crotch directly with his mouth or do so with a rosebud between his teeth. Almodóvar tried it out himself. "I realized it was better to put some distance between the actor's tongue and the girl's sex," he said, during an appearance on a Spanish talk show. "I do it all," he added.

Reception
Vincent Canby of The New York Times wrote, "The movie looks terrific and is acted with absolute, straight-faced conviction by the excellent cast headed by Miss Serna, Mr. Martinez and Mr. Banderas. Matador is of most interest as another work in the career of a film maker who, possibly, is in the process of refining a singular talent."

In his book Almodóvar on Almodóvar, the director admitted that he considered this film and Kika (1993) to be his two weakest.

On Rotten Tomatoes, Matador holds an approval rating of 92% based on 26 reviews, with an average rating of 7.3/10. The website's critics consensus reads, "Intertwining murder and seduction, Pedro Almodóvar's Matador is a provocative thriller that will shock even the most adventurous moviegoers."

References

External links
 
 
 

1986 films
1986 thriller films
1980s erotic thriller films
1980s psychological thriller films
1980s Spanish-language films
BDSM in films
Bullfighting films
Films about Opus Dei
Films directed by Pedro Almodóvar
Films produced by Agustín Almodóvar
Films scored by Bernardo Bonezzi
Films shot in Madrid
Spanish erotic thriller films
1980s Spanish films